Guo Hui (born 9 April 1978) is a former Chinese footballer.

Career statistics

Club

Notes

References

1978 births
Living people
Chinese footballers
Association football midfielders
Chinese Super League players
China League Two players
China League One players
Bayi Football Team players
Liaoning F.C. players
Beijing Guoan F.C. players
Dalian Professional F.C. players
Chinese expatriate sportspeople in Denmark